The Diary of Preston Plummer is a 2012 American drama film written and directed by Sean Ackerman and starring Trevor Morgan, Rumer Willis, Erin Dilly, Christopher Cousins and Robert Loggia.

Cast
Trevor Morgan as Preston Plummer
Rumer Willis as Kate Cather
Erin Dilly as Emily Cather
Christopher Cousins as Walter Cather
Robert Loggia as John Percy

Reception
Tracy Moore of Common Sense Media gave the film three stars out of five.

References

External links
 
 

American drama films
2010s English-language films
2010s American films